Orehovci is a settlement in the hills west of Radenci in northeastern Slovenia. It lies in the territory of the Municipality of Gornja Radgona.

References

External links

Orehovci on Geopedia

Populated places in the Municipality of Gornja Radgona